Bror Nyström (born 2 April 1953) is a Finnish sports shooter. He competed in the mixed skeet event at the 1984 Summer Olympics.

References

External links
 

1953 births
Living people
Finnish male sport shooters
Olympic shooters of Finland
Shooters at the 1984 Summer Olympics
People from Pargas
Sportspeople from Southwest Finland